The 1969–70 Dallas Chaparrals season was the third season of the Chaparrals in the American Basketball Association. Hagan (who had been player-coach since the team's inception) was fired halfway through the season, and General Manager Max Williams took over as coach. The Chaps once again fell in the ABA Semifinals. After the season, the team attempted to gain more fans in the state by playing games in Fort Worth and Lubbock, under the moniker of the Texas Chaparrals. This experiment was done for only one season, and the team re-branded back to being the Dallas Chaparrals before the next season started.

Roster 
 24 Charles Beasley - Shooting guard 
 44 John Beasley - Power forward 
 22 Bob Bedell - Power forward 
 12 Ron Boone - Shooting guard 
 50 Bob Christian - Center 
 10 Glen Combs - Point guard 
 16 Cliff Hagan - Small forward (also coach)
 32 Tom Hagan - Point guard 
 33 Rich Jones - Small forward 
 43 Manny Leaks - Center 
 31 Riney Lochmann - Small forward 
 25 Bill McGill - Center 
 34 Maurice McHartley - Shooting guard 
 35 Cincy Powell - Small forward 
 34 Willie Scott - Forward 
 55 John Smith - Center

Final standings

Western Division

Asterisk Denotes playoff team

Playoffs 
Western Division Semifinals

Chaparrals lose series 4–2

Awards and honors
1970 ABA All-Star Game selections (game played on January 24, 1970)
 Cincy Powell
 John Beasley
 Glen Combs

References

 Chaparrals on Basketball Reference

External links
 RememberTheABA.com 1969-70 regular season and playoff results
 RememberTheABA.com Dallas Chaparrals page

Dallas Chaparrals
Dallas
Texas Chaparrals, 1969-70
Texas Chaparrals, 1969-70